Kåre Opheim (born 2 October 1975 in Voss, Norway) is a Norwegian musician (drums), known from a series of albums and bands like Real Ones.
Opheim is an important partner in the "UNGjaJazzja" at Vossajazz. He is part of the Mads Berven Trio with a record release Mountains & the Sea in 2011, and played within Mike Gallaher Trio at Vossajazz 2009.

Honors 
Vossajazzprisen 2003

Discography 
With Real Ones
2002: This Is Camping (New Records, Norway)
2008: All for the Neighbourhood (Warner Music, Norway)

With Nathalie Nordnes
2003: Hush Hush (EMI Music, Norway)
2005: Join Me in the Park

With others
1998: Draum (Draum Records), with "Draum" (Morten Arnetvedt, Ingvild Bræin, Marius Larsen & Rikke Eri)
2002: It's A Record (New Records, Norway), with "Sergeant Petter"
2003: Pigs (Bluebox Records), with Heidi Marie Vestrheim
2003: Heim Te Mor (Universal Music, Norway), with Odd Nordstoga
2008: Song, Trø Lett På Hjarta Mitt (Crystal Air Records), with Berit Opheim
2011: Mountains & the Sea (Komanche), with his M.B. Trio

References

External links 
Real Ones on NRK

1975 births
Living people
Musicians from Voss
20th-century Norwegian drummers
21st-century Norwegian drummers
Norwegian jazz drummers
Male drummers
Norwegian jazz composers
20th-century drummers
Male jazz composers
20th-century Norwegian male musicians
21st-century Norwegian male musicians